This is a list of films which have placed number one at the weekend box office in Romania during 2014.

Highest-grossing films

The Hobbit: The Battle of the Five Armies became the 2nd film to surpass the 10 million lei mark.

See also 
 List of Romanian films
 List of highest-grossing films in Romania

References 

2014
2014 in Romanian cinema